Hayırlı is a village in the Derik District of Mardin Province in Turkey. The village had a population of 482 in 2021.

References 

Villages in Derik District
Kurdish settlements in Mardin Province